is a Japanese professional baseball player. He is currently a pitcher for the Tokyo Yakult Swallows.

Career
Ishikawa began his career with the Yakult Swallows in 2002, making his Nippon Professional Baseball (NPB) debut on April 4, 2002.

On April 7, 2022, Ishikawa became the 3rd pitcher in NPB history to record a hit in 21 consecutive seasons. The other pitchers to achieve the feat were Masaaki Koyama from 1953 to 1973 and Daisuke Miura (the manager of the Yokohama DeNA BayStars at the time) from 1993 to 2016.

References

External links

1980 births
Living people
Baseball people from Akita Prefecture
Aoyama Gakuin University alumni
Nippon Professional Baseball pitchers
Olympic baseball players of Japan
Baseball players at the 2000 Summer Olympics
Yakult Swallows players
Tokyo Yakult Swallows players
Nippon Professional Baseball Rookie of the Year Award winners
People from Akita (city)